Burir Char is a Union of Barguna Sadar Upazila, Barguna District in the Barisal Division of southern-central Bangladesh.

References

Unions of Barguna District
Uninhabited islands of Bangladesh
Islands of Bangladesh